Charles Gordon may refer to:

Politics and armed forces
 Charles Gordon, 1st Earl of Aboyne (1638–1681)
 Charles Gordon, 2nd Earl of Aboyne (1670–1702)
 Charles Gordon, 4th Earl of Aboyne (1726–1794)
 Charles Gordon (Royal Navy officer) (c. 1780–1860)
 Charles Gordon, 10th Marquess of Huntly (1792–1863), Scottish peer and politician
 Charles George Gordon (1833–1885), British army officer and colonial governor, killed at Khartoum
 Charles Gordon, 11th Marquess of Huntly (1847–1937), Scottish Liberal politician
 Charlie Gordon (born 1951), Scottish Labour Party politician
 Charles William Gordon (MP) (1817–1863), British Conservative politician
 Charles Gordon (parliamentary clerk) (1918–2009), English parliamentary clerk

Sports
 Charles Gordon (cricketer, born 1849) (1849–1930), English cricketer
 Charles Gordon (cricketer, born 1814) (1814–1899), English cricketer and gin distiller
 Charles Gordon (Canadian football) (born 1968), Canadian football player
 Charles Gordon (American football) (born 1984), American cornerback

Other
 Ralph Connor (1860–1937), pen name of Rev. Charles William Gordon, Canadian novelist
 Charles Blair Gordon (1867–1939), Canadian banker
 Charles Gordon (trade unionist) (died 1929), British trade union leader
 Charles Gordon (lawyer) (1905–1999), American immigration attorney
 Charles Gordon (artist) (1909–1978), watercolor artist
 Charles Gordon (journalist) (born 1940), Canadian writer and journalist
 Charles Jason Gordon (born 1959), bishop of Barbados
 Charles Gordon (producer) (1947–2020), film producer of October Sky
 Charles Grant Gordon (1927–2013), Scottish whisky distiller

Characters 
 Charlie Gordon, the main character in Flowers for Algernon by Daniel Keyes, and in the film adaptation Charly

See also